78 Squadron or 78th Squadron may refer to:

 No. 78 Squadron RAAF, a unit of the Royal Australian Air Force 
 No. 78 Squadron RAF, a unit of the United Kingdom Royal Air Force 
 78th Reconnaissance Squadron, a unit of the United States Air Force

See also
 78th Division (disambiguation)
 78th Regiment (disambiguation)